Varjão is a municipality in western Goiás state, Brazil.

Geography and Demographics
Varjão is located 77 km. southwest of Goiânia and is 26 km. southeast of Cezarina.  Highway connections from Goiânia are made by BR-060/Abadia de Goiás/Guapó/GO-413.  Aragoiânia, Cezarina, Indiara, Mairipotaba are adjacent to Varjão. Its postcode (CEP) is 75355-000, and its IBGE statistical microregion is 014 Vale do Rio dos Bois.

 the Brazilian Institute of Geography and Statistics estimates the population of Varjão to be 3,848 inhabitants.

Government
 Rafael Pereira Machado Franco is Varjão's mayor. The city council has nine members and there are 3,022 eligible voters .

Economy
The economy is based on subsistence agriculture, cattle raising, services, public administration, and small transformation industries.

Industrial units: 1 (2007)
Commercial units: 38 (2007)
Motor vehicles: 420  (2007), which gave a ratio of 9 inhabitants for each motor vehicle
Cattle herd: 48,000 head (7,210 milk cows) (2006)
Poultry: 19,300 head (2006)
Swine: 3,450 head (2006)
Main crops: rice (200 hectares), sugarcane, oranges, beans, manioc, corn (600 hectares), and soybeans. (Sepin)

Health and education
In 2006, the 1,141 students in Varjão were served by four schools, with a total of 22 classrooms and 27 teachers.  In 2000, its school attendance rate was 0.806. There are no higher education facilities.  Varjão's adult literacy rate was 83.0% in 2000, just below the national average of 86.4%.

In 2003, there were no hospitals and two ambulatory clinics in Varjão.  In 2002, two doctors, one nurse, and one dentist lived in the town.  The town's infant mortality rate 22.64 (2000) is well below the national average of 33.0.  In 2000, the town's life expectancy was 69.4.

The score on the Municipal Human Development Index  was 0.729 in 2000, ranking it at 149 out of 242 municipalities in the state of Goiás and 2,456 out of 5,507 municipalities in Brazil overall.

See also 
List of municipalities in Goiás
Microregions of Goiás

References

Frigoletto

Municipalities in Goiás